The 2000 Mid-American Conference baseball tournament took place in May 2000. The top three regular season finishers from each division met in the double-elimination tournament held at Gene Michael Field on the campus of Kent State University in Kent, Ohio. This was the twelfth Mid-American Conference postseason tournament to determine a champion. Third seed from the east  won their second tournament championship to earn the conference's automatic bid to the 2000 NCAA Division I baseball tournament.

Seeding and format 
The top three finishers in each division, based on conference winning percentage only, participated in the tournament. The top seed in each division played the third seed from the opposite division in the first round. The teams played double-elimination tournament. This was the third year of the six team tournament. Central Michigan claimed the top seed from the West over Ball State by tiebreaker.

Results

All-Tournament Team 
The following players were named to the All-Tournament Team.

Most Valuable Player 
John Lackaff won the Tournament Most Valuable Player award. Lackaff played for Miami.

References 

Tournament
Mid-American Conference Baseball Tournament
Mid-American Conference baseball tournament
Mid-American Conference baseball tournament